Harry Franklin "Cowboy" Hill (March 30, 1899 – February 3, 1966) was an American football tailback who played four seasons with the Toledo Maroons, Kansas City Blues/Cowboys and New York Giants of the National Football League. He played college football at the University of Oklahoma and attended Chickasha High School in Chickasha, Oklahoma.

References

External links
Just Sports Stats

1899 births
1966 deaths
Players of American football from Oklahoma
American football running backs
Oklahoma Sooners football players
Toledo Maroons players
Kansas City Blues (NFL) players
Kansas City Cowboys (NFL) players
New York Giants players
People from Pittsburg County, Oklahoma